Long Tungan (also known as Kenyah Jamok) is a settlement in the Marudi division of Sarawak, Malaysia.

The people are from the Kenyah Jamok tribe. The village is located in the Upper Baram region between Lio Matoh  (upstream) and Long Semiyang  (downstream).

Neighbouring settlements include:

References

Villages in Sarawak